Black Ken is a self-produced and self-released mixtape by American rapper Lil B. The mixtape was officially released on August 17, 2017 and features contributions from iLoveMakonnen. Lil B described the record as his "first official mixtape" and dedicated it as a tribute to various artists such as Kanye West, Iggy Azalea, Lupe Fiasco and Charles Hamilton.

Although the mixtape's official release was August 17, DatPiff accidentally leaked the album a day prior.

Critical reception

Pitchfork critic Meaghan Garvey gave the record the "Best New Music" accolade, describing it as "27 tracks of deep funk and hyphy that finally define the mercurial Based God" and "a mile-marker along Lil B's journey." Garvey further wrote: "What ties Black Ken together, and what makes it not just a palatable but completely thrilling listen, like stumbling unwittingly into the best block party ever, is Lil B's production throughout—a wild but controlled stylistic breakthrough."

Accolades

Track listing
All songs produced and composed by Lil B.

 "Produced by the BasedGod Intro" - 2:53
 "Still Run It" - 3:33
 "Bad MF" - 3:40
 "Wasup JoJo" - 3:05
 "Hip Hop" - 2:58
 "DJ BasedGod" - 6:52
 "Berkeley" - 5:09
 "Free Life" - 5:09
 "Pretty Boy Skit" - 0:38
 "Young Niggaz" - 3:30
 "Getting Hot" - 3:42
 "Go Stupid Go Dumb" - 3:46
 "Global" (feat. iLoveMakonnen) - 5:20
 "Ride (Hold Up)" - 3:20
 "Mexico Skit" - 0:45
 "Zam Bose (In San Jose)" - 3:24
 "Go Senorita Go" - 3:52
 "Turn Up (Till You Can't)" - 3:31
 "Ain't Me" - 3:18
 "Raw" - 5:27
 "West Coast" - 4:16
 "The Real is Back" - 4:26
 "Rawest Rapper Alive" - 4:55
 "Da Backstreetz" - 4:08
 "Rare Art" - 4:18
 "Show Promoter Skit" - 0:26
 "Live from the Island - Hawaii" - 2:53

See also
 Ken (doll)

References

External links
 Black Ken on DatPiff

2017 mixtape albums
Lil B albums
Deep funk albums
Hyphy albums